The  2006 Campeonato Brasileiro Série C, the third division of the Brazilian League, was contested by 63 clubs, four of which eventually qualified to the second division to be contested in 2007. No teams were relegated, since there was no fourth division in the Brazilian league.

Competition format

First stage
The 63 teams play in 15 groups of four and one group of three teams (because the Football Federation of Acre failed to appoint one affiliated team). Within each group, the four teams play a double round robin, i.e. they play each other in home and away matches, totalling six matchdays. The two best ranked teams in each group qualify to the Second Stage.

Second stage
The 32 teams qualified from the First Stage play in eight groups of four. Within each group, the four teams play a double round robin, i.e. they play each other in home and away matches, totalling six matchdays. The two best ranked teams in each group qualify to the Third Stage.

Third stage
The 16 teams qualified from the Second Stage play in four groups of four. Within each group, the four teams play a double round robin, i.e. they play each other in home and away matches, totalling six matchdays. The two best ranked teams in each group qualify to the Final Stage.

Final Stage
The eight teams qualified from the Third Stage are put together in a single group. They play a double round robin, i.e. they play each other in home and away matches, totalling fourteen matchdays. The four best ranked teams are automatically promoted to the Série B in 2007.

Participating teams
The participating teams are sorted by state:

Stages of the competition

First stage
Group 1 (AC-AM-PA)

Group 2 (AP-AM-PA-RR)

Group 3 (MT-RO-TO)

Group 4 (MA-PI)

Group 5 (CE-PB-PE-RN)

Group 6 (CE-PB-PE-RN)

Group 7 (AL-BA-SE)

Group 8 (AL-BA-SE)

Group 9 (DF-GO-MS)

Group 10 (DF-GO-MS-MG)

Group 11 (ES-MG-RJ-SP)

Group 12 (ES-MG-RJ-SP)

Group 13 (RJ-SP)

Group 14 (PR-SP)

Group 15 (PR-RS-SC)

Group 16 (RS-SC)

Second stage
Group 17 (MA-MT-PA)

Group 18 (AM-MT-PI)

Group 19 (AL-BA-CE-PB)

Group 20 (BA-CE-PB-SE)

Group 21 (GO-MG)

Group 22 (GO-MG-RJ-SP)

Group 23 (RJ-SC-SP)

Group 24 (PR-RS-SP)

Third stage
Group 25 (AM-BA-CE-PA)

Group 26 (BA-PA-PB-PI)

Group 27 (GO-MG-RS-SP)

Group 28 (MG-PR-SC-SP)

Final stage
Group 29 (BA-CE-MG-PB-RS-SC-SP)

External links
2006 Campeonato Brasileiro Série C at RSSSF

3
Campeonato Brasileiro Série C seasons